Cosmin Gabriel Atanase (born 3 January 2001) is a Romanian professional footballer who plays as a midfielder for Liga I side Chindia Târgoviște.

Honours
Chindia Târgoviște
Liga II: 2018–19

References

External links
 

2001 births
Living people
Sportspeople from Târgoviște
Romanian footballers
Association football midfielders
Liga I players
Liga II players
AFC Chindia Târgoviște players